Slavery existed in the area of later Saudi Arabia from antiquity onward.

Hejaz (the western region of modern day Saudi Arabia), which encompasses approximately 12% of the total land area of Saudi Arabia, was under the control of the Ottoman Empire from 1517 to 1918, and as such nominally obeyed the Ottoman laws. When the area became an independent nation first as the Kingdom of Hejaz and then as Saudi Arabia, it became internationally known as a slave trade center during the interwar period. After World War II, growing international pressure eventually resulted in the formal abolition of the practice. Slavery was formally abolished in 1962.

Background

The area of later Saudi Arabia was nominally under the Ottoman Empire between 1517 and 1918, and as such it nominally adhered to the same laws as the rest of the Ottoman Empire in regard to the slavery and slave trade. In 1908, the Ottoman Empire nominally abolished slavery, but this law was not enforced in the Arabian Peninsula by the Ottoman authorities.

Slave trade

After World War I, the area formed an independent nation as the Kingdom of Hejaz (1916–1925). Hejaz did not consider itself obliged to obey the laws and treaties signed by the Ottoman Empire in regard to slavery and slave trade. During the Interwar period, the Kingdom of Hejaz was internationally known as a regional slave trade center.

The slave trade had two major routes to Hejaz. African slaves were trafficked from primarily Sudan and Ethiopia.  Primarily children and young women were bought or given as tribute by their parents to Ethiopian chiefs, who sold them to slave traders.  The parents were told that their children were going to be given a better life as slaves in Arabia.  The slaves were delivered to Arabian slave traders by the coast, and shipped across the Red Sea to Jeddah.

The second slave route were connected to the Hajj pilgrimage.  Slave traders trafficked primarily women and children in the guise of wives, servants and pilgrims to Hejaz, where they were sold after arrival.   The victims of this trafficking route were sometimes tricked, and taken on Hajj under false pretences.  Slave traders trafficked women to Hejaz by marrying them and then taking them on the Hajj, were they were sold: afterwards, their families were told that their women had died during the journey.  In a similar fashion, parents entrusted their children to slave traders under the impression that the slave traders were taking their children on Hajj, as servants, or as students.  This category of traffic victims came from all over the Muslim world, as far away as the East Indies and China.  Some travellers sold their servants or poor travel companions in the Hajj, in order to pay for their travel costs.

In the 1930s and 1940s, it was reported that a third route of Baluchi slaves from Baluchistan was shipped to Saudi Arabia via Oman and the Gulf states.  It was reported that some Baluchis sold themselves or their children to slave traders to escape poverty.

Function
The Kingdom had many slaves, since free wage laborers were rare: in 1930, ten percent of the population of Mecca were estimated to have been slaves.  Many slaves were used as domestic servants and harem eunuchs, but they could also be used as craftsmen, sailors, pearl divers, fishermen, shepherds and camel drivers.  Slaves were seen as a good investment and were popular as servants, because they lacked loyalty ties to other clans in the strict clan system.  Many men saw an advantage in buying a concubine rather than to marry a free woman. Christian Javanese or Chinese women were valued as concubines and sold for $500, while African women were sold for $100.  In 1943, it was reported that Baluchi girls were shipped via Oman to Mecca, where they were popular as concubines since Caucasian girls were no longer available, and were sold for 350-$450.

Activism against slave trade

The British fought the slave trade by patrolling the Red Sea.  However, these controls were not effective, since the slave traders would inform the European Colonial authorities that the slaves were their wives, children, servants or fellow Hajj pilgrims, and the victims themselves were convinced of the same, unaware that they were being shipped as slaves.

Since the British Consulate had opened in Jeddah in the 1870s, the British had used their diplomatic privileges to manumit the slaves escaping to the British Consulate to ask for asylum.  Royal slaves were exempted from this right. 
The French, Italian and Dutch Consulate also used their right to manumit the slaves who reached their consulate to ask for asylum.  However, the activity of France and Italy was very limited, and only the Dutch were as willing to use this right as Britain.  The right for manumission by seeking asylum could be used by any slave who managed to reach the consul office or a ship belonging to a foreign power.  Most slaves who used this right were citizens of these nations' colonies, who had travelled to Arabia without being aware that they would be sold as slaves upon arrival.  The manumission activity of the foreign consuls was met with formal cooperation by the Arabian authorities but greatly disliked by the local population, and it was common for slaves seeking asylum to disappear between seeking asylum and the moment the consul could arrange a place for them on a boat.

The slavery and slave trade in the Arabian Peninsula, and particular in Saudi Arabia (Kingdom of Hejaz), attracted attention by the League of Nations and contributed to the creation of the 1926 Slavery Convention, obliging the British to combat the slave trade in the area.

Between 1928 and 1931, the British consulate in Jeddah helped 81 people to be manumitted, 46 of whom were repatriated to Sudan and 25 to Massawa in Etiophia.  The vast majority of slaves originated from Africa, but the fact that the majority of them had been trafficked as children posed a problem for the authorities. They could not remember exactly where they had come from or where their family lived, could no longer speak any language other than Arabic, and thus had difficulty supporting themselves after repatriation, all of which in the 1930s had caused a reluctance from the authorities to receive them.

In 1936, Saudi Arabia formally banned the import of slaves who were not already slaves prior to entering the kingdom, a reform which was however on paper only.

Abolition

After World War II, there was growing international pressure from the United Nations to end the slave trade.  In 1948, the United Nations declared slavery to be a crime against humanity in the Universal Declaration of Human Rights, after which the Anti-Slavery Society pointed out that there was about one million slaves in the Arabian Peninsula, which was a crime against the 1926 Slavery Convention, and demanded that the UN form a committee to handle the issue.

In 1962, Saudi Arabia abolished slavery officially; however, unofficial slavery is rumored to exist.

According to the U.S. State Department as of 2005:
Saudi Arabia is a destination for men and women from South and East Asia and East Africa trafficked for the purpose of labor exploitation, and for children from Yemen, Afghanistan, and Africa trafficked for forced begging. Hundreds of thousands of low-skilled workers from India, Indonesia, the Philippines, Sri Lanka, Bangladesh, Ethiopia, Eritrea, and Kenya migrate voluntarily to Saudi Arabia; some fall into conditions of involuntary servitude, suffering from physical and sexual abuse, non-payment or delayed payment of wages, the withholding of travel documents, restrictions on their freedom of movement and non-consensual contract alterations.

The Government of Saudi Arabia does not comply with the minimum standards for the elimination of trafficking and is not making significant efforts to do so.

After the abolition of slavery, poor migrant workers were employed under the Kafala system, which have been compared to slavery.

See also

 Afro-Saudis
 Treaty of Jeddah (1927)
 History of slavery in the Muslim world
 Human trafficking in Saudi Arabia
 History of concubinage in the Muslim world
 Slavery in Oman
 Human trafficking in the Middle East
 Kafala system

References

 Ehud R. Toledano, The Ottoman Slave Trade and Its Suppression: 1840-1890
 William Gervase Clarence-Smith, The Economics of the Indian Ocean Slave Trade 
 John Slight, The British Empire and the Hajj: 1865–1956
 C.W.W. Greenidge, Slavery
 Chanfi Ahmed, AfroMecca in History: African Societies, Anti-Black Racism
 Gwyn Campbell, Abolition and Its Aftermath in the Indian Ocean Africa and Asia

1962 disestablishments in Saudi Arabia
Saudi Arabia
Saudi Arabia
Society of Saudi Arabia
Human rights abuses in Saudi Arabia
Islam and slavery